Rabbi Matondo (born 12 July 2000) is a professional footballer who plays as a winger for Scottish Premiership club Rangers and the Wales national team.

Matondo played youth football for Cardiff City and Manchester City. He joined German club Schalke 04 in January 2019, where he made 32 first-team appearances and was sent on loan to Stoke City and Cercle Brugge. He signed for Rangers in July 2022.

Born in England to parents from the DR Congo, Matondo was eligible to play for either country, as well as Wales, where he grew up. Having played for the England under-15 team, he later opted to represent Wales and played at under-17 and under-21 levels before making his debut for the senior national team in November 2018.

Early life
Matondo was born in Liverpool, England but moved to south-east Wales as a child. He grew up in the Tremorfa area of Cardiff where he first played football in local parks with his father and brothers. His father Dada played football in his native DR Congo. Two of his brothers, Cedrick and Japhet, also played football at youth level. As a teenager he attended Llanishen High School.

Club career

Early career
Matondo began his career as a youth player with Cardiff City. In 2016, he moved to Premier League side Manchester City for a small compensation fee under the Elite Player Performance Plan, an initiative created by the Premier League regarding movement of youth players. Cardiff appealed against the move and Matondo was blocked from playing for Manchester City until March 2017 when the appeal was denied. However, a fee of £500,000 was reported to have been agreed.

He made his debut for the Manchester City U21 side in the EFL Trophy on 15 August 2017 against Rotherham United, scoring his first goal in the side's next match, a 2–1 defeat to Bradford City. He added two more goals in the 2018–19 EFL Trophy,  the game's only away to Tranmere Rovers in the final group game, and one more in a 3–3 draw at Barnsley in the second round, as well as netting in the subsequent penalty shootout win.

Schalke 04
On 30 January 2019, Matondo signed for Bundesliga club Schalke 04 for a reported fee of up to £11 million on a four-and-a-half-year deal. He made his professional league debut three days later in a 2–0 home loss to Borussia Mönchengladbach, as a 75th-minute substitute for Sebastian Rudy; on 16 February he was given a start in a goalless home draw with SC Freiburg. On 28 September 2019, he scored his first goal for Schalke in a 3–1 away victory over RB Leipzig.

On 7 January 2021, Matondo joined EFL Championship club Stoke City on a loan deal until the end of the 2020–21 season. He played 11 times for Stoke, scoring once in a 1–1 draw with Nottingham Forest on 24 April 2021.

On 9 August 2021, Matondo agreed to join Cercle Brugge on a season-long loan with an option to make the move permanent.

Rangers
On 12 July 2022, Rangers announced the signing of Matondo on a four-year deal, subject to international clearance. He made his debut for the club against Belgian side Union Saint-Gilloise during a UEFA Champions League qualifier loss on 2 August.
On 4 October 2022, he made his 5th UEFA Champions League appearance for Rangers away against Liverpool as a substitute. Rangers lost 2-0, however their first big chance in the game came through Matondo in the 84th minute (3 minutes after he came on), where his pace allowed him to breeze past Joel Matip and nutmeg Liverpool goalkeeper Alisson Becker, but had his shot cleared off the line by Kostas Tsimikas before it could be tapped into the net by Fashion Sakala.

International career
Matondo was eligible to represent DR Congo, England or Wales at international level. He represented England at under-15 level before switching allegiance to Wales at under-17 level. He made 10 appearances for the under-17 team. He received his first call up to the Wales under-21 squad in September 2017, making his debut for the side in a 3–1 victory over Liechtenstein. After appearing in four qualifying matches as a substitute, he made his first start for the under-21 side in a 1–1 draw with Georgia in the second of two friendlies against the nation in June 2018. He played eight games in total at under-21 level.

In November 2018, Matondo received his first call up for the senior Welsh squad for a friendly against Albania. He made his international debut during the match on 20 November as a 78th-minute substitute in place of Sam Vokes as Wales lost 1–0 in Elbasan.

In May 2019, after travelling back to England from a Welsh national team training camp in Portugal, Matondo was escorted from the plane by police after "behaving disruptively".

On 8 October 2020, Matondo started for Wales in a friendly against England.

On 1 June 2022, Matondo came on as a half time substitute for Wales in a Nations League Group A game against Poland. Wales lost 2-1 with Matondo providing the assist for Jonny Williams's Wales goal.

Career statistics

Club

International

References

2000 births
Living people
Footballers from Liverpool
Welsh footballers
Wales youth international footballers
Wales under-21 international footballers
Wales international footballers
English footballers
Welsh people of Democratic Republic of the Congo descent
British sportspeople of Democratic Republic of the Congo descent
English sportspeople of Democratic Republic of the Congo descent
Cardiff City F.C. players
Manchester City F.C. players
Association football wingers
FC Schalke 04 players
FC Schalke 04 II players
Stoke City F.C. players
Cercle Brugge K.S.V. players
Welsh expatriate footballers
Expatriate footballers in Germany
Welsh expatriates in Germany
Bundesliga players
Oberliga (football) players
Regionalliga players
English Football League players
Belgian Pro League players
Rangers F.C. players
Scottish Professional Football League players